Rush Run is a stream in the U.S. state of West Virginia. It is a tributary of the New River.

Rushing water during floods accounts for the name, according to local history.

See also
List of rivers of West Virginia

References

Rivers of Fayette County, West Virginia
Rivers of West Virginia